The 1997 Alabama Crimson Tide football team represented the University of Alabama in the college football season of 1997–98. The team's head coach was Mike DuBose, who was entering his first year at Alabama. They played their home games at both Bryant–Denny Stadium in Tuscaloosa and Legion Field in Birmingham, Alabama and competed in the West Division of the Southeastern Conference. Alabama would finish with a record of 4–7 record in suffering the program's first losing season since the 1984 season. The loss against Kentucky marked Alabama's first ever overtime game, as overtime rules for college football had gone into effect the previous season.

Schedule

Coaching staff

Game summaries

Houston

A sell-out crowd filled Legion Field as the Mike Dubose era got off to a great start with the Crimson Tide rolling to a big win over Houston. Alabama's 42 points was the most any Alabama team had put up in a game since the season opener in 1994.

Vanderbilt

Alabama defense would hold Vanderbilt offense to 124 yards as the Crimson Tide won its first road and conference game of the year in shutout fashion.

Arkansas

For the second time in a row, Arkansas would come to Bryant-Denny Stadium and upset a ranked Alabama team by one point. Alabama held a 16-10 lead late in the game but, an Anthony Eubanks touchdown grab of 29 yards from Clint Stoerner gave Arkansas a one-point win.

Southern Miss

After being tied at halftime, Alabama would outscore Southern Miss 17-3 in the second half lead by Alabama defense forcing three Southern Miss turnovers.

Kentucky

A back and forth shootout ended with a 26-yard game-winning touchdown pass from Kentucky QB Tim Couch to give Kentucky its first win over Alabama since 1922. Alabama had the ball first in overtime but, a Chad Goss fumble gave Kentucky an opportunity to score and win with their possession. This would mark the first overtime game ever for both teams.

Tennessee

For the third straight year, Tennessee would beat Alabama. Alabama would kick two early field goals to have a 6-0 lead but Tennessee would score the next 28 points to put the game out of reach for Alabama. This game would be the last Third Saturday in October  game to be played at Legion Field.

Ole Miss

Mike DuBose would get his first win against a ranked team as the Crimson Tide ended their two-game losing streak with a win against Ole Miss.

Louisiana Tech

For the first time since the 1990 season, Alabama would lose a non-conference game. This was also the first homecoming loss for Alabama since 1990, and the first time Louisiana Tech had ever defeated Alabama. Coming into the game, the Bulldogs had the third-ranked passing offense in college football.

LSU

LSU returned the favor after Alabama shutout LSU in Tiger Stadium in 1996 by shutting out Alabama at Bryant-Denny Stadium. This was the first time Alabama had been shutout since 1991.

Mississippi State

For the first time since 1957, Mississippi State would win in Bryant-Denny Stadium. The loss also meant Alabama would not win a game at Bryant-Denny Stadium for the first time since 1955. The loss also guaranteed Alabama its first losing season since 1984.

Auburn

Despite being an underdog, Alabama would lead for most of the game and be in a position to put the game away but an Ed Scissum fumble recovered by Auburn put them in field goal range to take the lead and ultimately give them the win. Alabama would try a 57-yard field goal with A.J. Diaz as time expired but it fell short. Alabama seven losses was the most Alabama had had in a season since 1957.

References

Alabama
Alabama Crimson Tide football seasons
Alabama Crimson Tide football